Joéliton Lima Santos (born 17 April 1993), commonly known as Mansur, is a Brazilian footballer who plays as a left back for Portuguese club Estrela.

Club career
Born in Laranjeiras, Mansur started his career with the youth academy of Bahia and made his first team debut in 2011. However, he moved to Vitória on 10 January 2012, after his former club failed to clear his fees. On 10 July, he scored his first goal for the club in a 4–3 victory against Paraná. However, he faced stiff competition after the arrival of Gilson on loan from Cruzeiro. On 25 May 2013, he made his Série A debut in a 2–2 draw against Internacional.

In February 2014, Vitória received an offer from Atlético Mineiro to secure Mansur's services. On 8 August 2015, he was loaned out to Atlético Mineiro on a contract running till January 2016. On 3 September, he made his debut in a 1–0 defeat against Atlético Paranaense. On 19 January 2016, he signed permanently with the club, after agreeing to a four-year deal.

After being rarely used in Atlético Mineiro, Mansur joined Sport on 26 June 2016 to get more opportunities and signed a contract which would keep him at the club till May 2017. However, he was sparingly used and made 13 appearances. On 30 January 2018, he joined newly promoted side Paraná on a loan deal until the end of the season.

International career
Mansur played for Brazil under-20 team in 2013, representing the team in the 2013 Copa Sudamericana under-20.

Career statistics

Honours
Vitória
Campeonato Baiano: 2013

References

External links
 Profile at iG Esporte

1993 births
Sportspeople from Sergipe
Living people
Brazilian footballers
Brazil youth international footballers
Association football defenders
Esporte Clube Bahia players
Esporte Clube Vitória players
Clube Atlético Mineiro players
Sport Club do Recife players
Paraná Clube players
Esporte Clube São Bento players
C.D. Santa Clara players
C.F. Estrela da Amadora players
Campeonato Brasileiro Série A players
Campeonato Brasileiro Série B players
Primeira Liga players
Liga Portugal 2 players
Brazilian expatriate footballers
Brazilian expatriate sportspeople in Portugal
Expatriate footballers in Portugal